Felicia Chin Foong Ling (born 24 October 1984), who was also once known by her Chinese stage name Chen Jing Xuan from 2008 to 2013 is a Singaporean actress was named as one of the Seven Princesses of Mediacorp in 2006. In 2013, she decided to use her given Chinese name instead for her acting career.

Career
In 2003, Chin participated in MediaCorp Channel 8's Star Search Singapore television programme and emerged as overall female champion of the contest. She took on her Chinese stage name Chen Jing Xuan, after being advised to do so. Chin worked at MediaCorp as an actress, making her debut role in the 2003 television drama Always on My Mind. In 2006, she had her first time being the first female lead in The Beginning, a Singapore-Malaysia co-production. Chin is one of the Top 10 Most Popular Female Artistes of MediaCorp.

In Star Awards 2006, Chin was nominated for Best Supporting Actress. In Star Awards 2009 & Star Awards 2015 , Chin was nominated for Best Actress.

Chin cites top actress Huang Biren as someone whom she looks up to in the industry.

In May 2010, Chin announced that she would be switching to part-time acting to study for a BBA degree in the National University of Singapore Business School. In 2012, Chin told the Singaporean magazine 8 Days that she would be in Shanghai for one year as part of the NUS Overseas Colleges programme. 

In 2013, Chin announced that she would be returning to full-time acting without completing her studies. She decided to drop her stage name as well and use her given name instead.

Chin has gotten 10 out of 10 Top 10 Most Popular Female Artistes from 2006-2010, 2015–2019 and 2022 respectively.

On 23 June 2022, Chin announced that her last day with Mediacorp would be 30 June, and she would be taking up a new job at faith-based platform Hai Hao Ma.

Personal life
Chin was educated at Tanjong Katong Girls' School and Victoria Junior College (VJC), where she was schoolmates with fellow artiste Lee Teng. As an avid softball player, she joined Singapore's national softball team in 2000, becoming the youngest member ever to join the team. She left the team three years later. She also won the National Inter-School A Division Softball Girls championship title with VJC in 2002.

In 2001, her father died due to cancer, thus wishing for a complete family in the future in a 2004 interview. 

On 22 October 2022, Chin married Mediacorp artiste, Jeffrey Xu. They had been dating since 2015.

Filmography

Film

Television

Discography

Awards and nominations

References

External links

Personal blog

Living people
1984 births
Singaporean people of Hakka descent
Singaporean television actresses
Singaporean women television presenters
Victoria Junior College alumni